Expressway S61 or express road S61 is a major planned road in Poland which is going to run from the Polish-Lithuanian border near Budzisko (connecting to Lithuanian A5) to Ostrów Mazowiecka (joining express road S8).

As of 2022, the part opened to traffic consists of three separate sections, forming the bypasses of Suwałki/Augustów, Szczuczyn and Stawiski. There is a complete expressway from Śniadowo to Łomża, from Łomża to Ełk and from Raczki to the Lithuanian border near Budzisko. The contracts for designing and building the rest of the road were signed in 2017-2022. The road will be a dual carriageway along its entire length, although the Łomża bypass will be opened as a single-carriageway road at first, the second carriageway being due to open to traffic a year later.  of the route are open to traffic as of 2022, with the remaining  mostly due to open to traffic in 2023, while the delayed Łomża bypass will not be fully complete until 2025.

Existing sections

The first section forming the bypass of Stawiski (6.5 km long) was opened to traffic in December 2013 as a single carriageway road.

The second section to open was part of the bypass of Augustów, opened to traffic in November 2014. The extension of this section was the bypass of Suwałki opened in April 2019 (25 km in total).

The third section (8 km) was the bypass of Szczuczyn opened in November 2015 as a single carriageway road. The second carriageway was opened in May 2020.

The fourth section (17.1 km long) was the connection between Śniadowo - Łomża Południe interchanges, opened to traffic in July 2021 as a dual carriageway road.

The fifth section (18 km long) was the connection between Szczuczyn and Stawiski, opened in July 2021 as a dual carriageway road.

The sixth section (35 km long) was the connection between Stawiski and Kolno, opened in August 2021 as a dual carriageway road.

The seventh section (20 km long) was the connection between Wysokie and Raczki, opened in December 2021 as a dual carriageway road.

The eighth section (23 km long) was the connection between Szczuczyn and Ełk Południe, opened in September 2022 as a dual carriageway road.

The ninth section (24 km long) was the connection between Suwałki and the Lithuanian border at Budzisko, opened in December 2022 as a dual carriageway road.

Route history
The expressway became part of the Poland's planned expressway network with the approval of the Council of Ministers of Poland of 20 October 2009. Before that, express road S8 was planned to continue from Białystok north to the Lithuanian border, serving as Via Baltica route. In 2009, S61 was introduced instead, while S8 was decided to end in Białystok. The change provides a shorter route for Via Baltica than originally planned, and the new course is viewed as a way to minimise its environmental impact on protected areas in northeastern Poland.

Exit list

References

Sources
Announcement of giving decision describing environmental conditions for building Augustów beltway , Polish Directorate of Environmental Protection

External links

Ministry of Infrastructure of the Republic of Poland
General Directorate for National Roads and Highways of the Republic of Poland

Expressways in Poland
Proposed roads in Poland